Lettice Sandford (born Lettice Mackintosh Rate; 1902–1993) was a draftsman, wood-engraver, pioneer corn dolly revivalist and watercolourist of her beloved Herefordshire.  She was a daughter of Lachlan Mackintosh Rate of Milton Court, Surrey, a director of the Imperial Ottoman Bank, the central bank of the Ottoman Empire, and wife of Christopher Sandford of Eye Manor, Herefordshire, proprietor of the Golden Cockerel Press, for which she provided wood-engravings.  She was the mother of playwright Jeremy Sandford.

References
 Obituary, The Times , 15 December 1993.
 Sandford, Christopher & Sandford, Lettice: The Magic Forest : a story [with wood engravings]. London: Chiswick Press, 1931.
 Sandford, Lettice: Coo my Doo. London: Frederick Muller, 1943.
 Sandford, Lettice & Davis, Philla: Decorative straw work and corn dollies. London: Batsford, 1964.
 Sandford, Lettice & Davis, Philla: Corn dollies and how to make them.  New ed. Hereford: Herefordshire Federation of Women's Institutes, 1966.
 Sandford, Lettice: Straw Work and Corn Dollies. London: Batsford, 1974.
 Dyer, Anne, Sandford, Lettice & Edwards, Zena: Country Crafts. London: Macdonald Educational, 1979.
 Sandford, Lettice: Wood Engravings. Pinner: David Chambers, 1985.
 Sandford, Jeremy: Figures and Landscapes: the art of Lettice Sandford. London: Roc Sandford, 1991.

1902 births
1993 deaths
20th-century British printmakers
20th-century English women artists
20th-century engravers
British engravers
British illustrators
English wood engravers
English watercolourists
English women painters
People from Surrey
Women engravers
Women watercolorists